Edward Phelps Lull (20 February 1836 – 5 March 1887) was an officer in the United States Navy who served as the commander of the Department of Alaska from August 10, 1881, to October 18, 1881.

Lull graduated from the US Naval Academy in 1855, and served in the Navy during and after the American Civil War, reaching the rank of captain in October 1881. He was the father of Professor Richard Swann Lull.

Notes

Commanders of the Department of Alaska
1836 births
1887 deaths